Fit for Fashion is a reality TV show on STAR World hosted by Louise Roe with fashion photographer Todd Anthony Tyler. The show features fitness trainers Christine Bullock and Mitch Chilson. Contestants face challenges and learn new skills while training and transforming their bodies. The first season of the show was filmed in Malaysia with the state of Terrenganu as its primary location and contestants' residence, while the second was filmed in Bintan Lagoon Resort, Indonesia.

The show had 2 seasons, Season 1 in Malaysia and Season 2 in Indonesia.

Series overview

References

External links
 Fit for Fashion website 

Fitness reality television series
2014 television series debuts
2016 television series endings